Australia competed at the 2020 Summer Olympics in Tokyo. Originally scheduled to take place from 24 July to 9 August 2020, the Games were postponed to 23 July to 8 August 2021, because of the COVID-19 pandemic. Australia is one of only five countries to have sent athletes to every Summer Olympics of the modern era, alongside Great Britain, France, Greece, and Switzerland.

Before the official postponement, the country initially withdrew from the Games over the coronavirus pandemic concerns. The executive board of the Australian Olympic Committee unanimously voted to tell their athletes to prepare for a postponed Games.

Australia competed in all sports except baseball, fencing, handball and wrestling. With Australia being hosted the 2032 Summer Olympics in Brisbane, the nation remained in the Japanese Gojūon order during the parade of nations between El Salvador and Austria.

Australia left Tokyo with 46 medals winning 17 gold medals equalling their best total from Athens 2004 along with 7 silver and 22 bronze.

Medallists

| width="55%" align="left" valign="top" |

|width="22%" align="left" valign="top"|

Competitors
The following is the list of number of competitors in the Games. 

Injuries, mental health concerns, family reasons and positive COVID infections led to several officially selected athletes withdrawing and being replaced where possible. These include: Justis Huni (boxing),  Nick Kyrgios (tennis), Alex de Minaur (tennis) replaced by Max Purcell, Liz Cambage (basketball) replaced by Sara Blicavs,  Chris Burton replaced by Stuart Tinney (equestrian), Cameron Meyer replaced by Lucas Hamilton,  Jack Haig replaced by Luke Durbridge (cycling), Marco Tilio replaced Ramy Najjarine and Jay Rich-Baghuelou replaced Ruon Tongyik (football), Penny Squibb (hockey) replaced Georgia Wilson, Henry Paterson (rugby 7's) replaced by Nathan Lawson and Dane Bird-Smith (athletics).

Archery

Three Australian archers qualified for the men's events by reaching the quarterfinal stage of the men's team recurve at the 2019 World Archery Championships in 's-Hertogenbosch, Netherlands.

On 6 March 2020, Rio 2016 bronze medallists Ryan Tyack and Taylor Worth, with David Barnes making his Olympic comeback after his debut in Athens 2004, were officially named to the men's archery team for the Games, based on their individual results at the four-part selection trials.

Artistic swimming

Australia fielded a squad of eight artistic swimmers to compete in the women's duet and team event through an Oceania continental selection in the team free routine at the 2019 FINA World Championships in Gwangju, South Korea. The artistic swimming squad, highlighted by Rio 2016 Olympians Hannah Cross, Emily Rogers, and Amie Thompson, were officially selected to the Australian roster for the Games on 26 February 2020. Initially set to compete in both duet and team events at the rescheduled Games, Rio 2016 Olympian Rose Stackpole officially announced her retirement from the sport in August 2020. Instead, rookie Hannah Burkhill was selected to complete the rest of the squad on 4 September 2020.

On 2 July 2021, Carolyn Rayna Buckle was announced as an inclusion to the team after the retirement of Hannah Cross.

Athletics

Australian athletes further achieved the entry standards, either by qualifying time or by world ranking, in the following track and field events (up to a maximum of three athletes in each event):

On 19 August 2020, national champions Stewart McSweyn and Jessica Hull  in the long-distance running, race walkers Jemima Montag and Rio 2016 bronze medallist Dane Bird-Smith, and reigning world javelin throw champion Kelsey-Lee Barber were the first track and field athletes officially selected to the Australian squad for the rescheduled Games.

On 3 July 2021, the track and field team was officially finalised by Athletics Australia with a contingent of 63 athletes set to represent Australia. On 25 July, Dane Bird-Smith withdrew from the team in the 20 km Walk for personal reasons.

Track & road events
Men

Women

Field events
Men

Women

Combined events – Men's decathlon

Badminton

Australia entered four badminton players (one man and three women) into the Olympic tournament based on the BWF Race to Tokyo Rankings; one entry each in the women's singles and a pair in the women's and mixed doubles. Setyana Mapasa, Gronya Somerville and Simon Leung will be making their Olympic debut, while Chen Hsuan-yu will be making her second appearance after being selected into the 2016 Rio Olympic team.

Basketball

Summary

Men's tournament

Australia men's basketball team qualified for the Olympics by advancing to the second round and securing an outright berth as the highest-ranked Oceania squad at the 2019 FIBA World Cup in China.

Team roster

Group play

Quarterfinal

Semifinal

Bronze medal game

Women's tournament

Australia women's basketball team qualified for the Olympics as one of three highest-ranked eligible squads at the Bourges meet of the 2020 FIBA Women's Olympic Qualifying Tournament.

Team roster

Group play

Quarterfinal

Boxing 

Australia entered six boxers (four men and two women) into the Olympic tournament. 2019 world bronze medallist Justis Huni (men's heavyweight) and 2018 Commonwealth Games champion Skye Nicolson (women's featherweight), along with rookies Alex Winwood (men's flyweight), Paulo Aokuso (men's light heavyweight), and Caitlin Parker (women's middleweight), secured the spots on the Australian squad by advancing to the semifinal match of their respective weight divisions at the 2020 Asia & Oceania Qualification Tournament in Amman, Jordan. Harrison Garside completed the nation's boxing lineup by topping the list of eligible boxers from Asia and Oceania in the men's lightweight division of the IOC's Boxing Task Force Rankings. Justis Huni withdrew due to a hand injury after boxing Paul Gallen in June 2021.

Canoeing

Slalom
Australian canoeists qualified one boat for each of the following classes through the 2019 ICF Canoe Slalom World Championships in La Seu d'Urgell, Spain and the 2020 Oceania Championships in Auckland, New Zealand. They must also compete at the Australian Open and in two trials of the Oceania Championships, both held in Penrith, New South Wales, to assure their selection to the nation's Olympic slalom canoeing team.

On 8 November 2019, multiple world and Olympic medallist Jessica Fox was officially selected to the Australian roster for her third consecutive Games, with Rio 2016 Olympian Lucien Delfour (men's K-1) and rookie Daniel Watkins (men's C-1) joining her three months later at the end of the selection trials.

Sprint
Australian canoeists qualified a total of six boats in each of the following distances for the Games through the 2019 ICF Canoe Sprint World Championships in Szeged, Hungary and the 2020 Oceania Championships in Penrith, New South Wales.

At the end of the two-stage selection trials, fourteen sprint canoe and kayak paddlers were officially named to the Australian team on 27 March 2020, with London 2012 gold medallist Murray Stewart in the men's K-4 500 metres making his third consecutive trip to the Games.

Men

Women

Qualification Legend: FA = Qualify to final (medal); FB = Qualify to final B (non-medal); SF = Qualify to semifinal round; QF = Qualify to quarterfinal round

Cycling

Road
Australia entered a squad of eight riders (four per gender) to compete in their respective Olympic road races, by virtue of their top 50 national finish (for men) and top 22 (for women) in the UCI World Ranking. Cameron Meyer later withdrew from the team.

The road cycling team was officially named on May 19, 2021, with two-time individual time trial world champion Rohan Dennis and dual world medallist Amanda Spratt returning to their third consecutive Games.

Men

Women

Track
Following the completion of the 2020 UCI Track Cycling World Championships, Australian riders accumulated spots for both men and women in team sprint, team pursuit, madison, and omnium based on their country's results in the final UCI Olympic rankings. As a result of their place in the men's and women's team sprint, Australia won its right to enter two riders in both men's and women's sprint and men's and women's keirin.

The full Australian track cycling squad was officially named on 19 March 2020, with Matthew Glaetzer (men's team sprint) and Annette Edmondson (women's team pursuit) riding for their third consecutive Games. Cameron Meyer withdrew on 5 July 2021 due to personal reasons.

Sprint

Team sprint

Qualification legend: FA=Gold medal final; FB=Bronze medal final

Pursuit

Keirin

Omnium

Madison

Mountain biking
Australian mountain bikers qualified for one men's and one women's quota place each into the Olympic cross-country race, as a result of the top-two finish vying for the men's qualification under the elite category at the 2019 UCI World Championships in Mont-Sainte-Anne, Canada, and the nation's twenty-first-place finish for women, respectively, in the UCI Olympic Ranking List of 16 May 2021.

BMX
Australian riders qualified for three quota place (one men and two women) for BMX at the Olympics, as a result of the nation's sixth-place finish for men and fifth for women in the UCI BMX Olympic Qualification Ranking List of 1 June 2021.

Racing

Freestyle

Diving

Australian divers qualified for the following individual spots at the Games through the 2019 FINA World Championships and 2019 Oceania Championships. They must compete at the 2020 Australian Open Championships to assure their selection to the Olympic team.

Equestrian

Australian equestrians qualified a full squad in the team dressage competition by receiving a spare berth freed up by host nation Japan, as the top-ranked nation from Southeast Asia and Oceania, not yet qualified, at the 2018 FEI World Equestrian Games in Tryon, North Carolina, United States. Additionally, the country's eventing and show jumping teams qualified for the Games by virtue of a top-six finish each in the same tournament.

The Australian equestrian teams for dressage and eventing were unveiled on June 25, 2021. At age 66, Mary Hanna is set to become the oldest Australian Olympian on record. The jumping team was named on June 30, 2021.

Dressage

Qualification Legend: Q = Qualified for the final; q = Qualified for the final as a lucky loser

Eventing
Stuart Tinney and Leporis have been named the team alternates. Originally-selected Chris Burton later withdrew, causing Tinney to step in, and granting Kevin McNab and Don Quidam to become the new traveling alternates. McNab later replaced Tinney shortly prior to the competition.

Jumping
Rowan Willis and Blue Movie were named the team alternates but withdrew on 8 July. On 21 July, Jamie Kermond was removed as part of the Jumping team after testing positive for the use of cocaine, in a recreational capacity, from a sample given in an out of competition test conducted on 26 June. On 23 July Katie Laurie and Edwina Tops-Alexander were confirmed as Individual competitors.

Field hockey

Summary

Men's tournament

Australia men's national field hockey team qualified for the Olympics by beating New Zealand with a unanimous 3–0 for a gold-medal victory at the 2019 Oceania Cup in Rockhampton, Queensland.

Team roster

Group play

Quarterfinal

Semifinal

Gold medal game

Women's tournament

Australia women's national field hockey team qualified for the Olympics by securing one of the seven tickets available and defeating Russia in a playoff at the Perth leg of the 2019 FIH Olympic Qualifiers.

Team roster

Group play

Quarterfinal

Football

Summary

Men's tournament

For the first time in twelve years, Australia men's football team qualified for the Games by winning the bronze medal and securing the last of three available berths of the 2020 AFC U-23 Championship in Thailand.

Team roster

Group play

Women's tournament

Australia women's football team qualified for the Games by defeating Vietnam in a two-legged playoff of the 2020 AFC Olympic Qualifying Tournament.

Team roster

Group play

Quarterfinal

Semifinal

Bronze medal match

Golf

Australia entered two male and two female golfers into the Olympic tournament. Adam Scott qualified for the men's event but chose not to play.

Gymnastics

Artistic
Australia entered two artistic gymnasts into the Olympic competition. American-based Tyson Bull secured one of the two places available for individual-based gymnasts, neither part of the team nor qualified through the all-around, in the horizontal bar exercise, while two additional berths were awarded to the Australian female gymnasts, who participated in the women's individual all-around and apparatus events at the 2019 World Championships in Stuttgart, Germany and at the 2021 Oceania Championships in Gold Coast, Queensland.

Men

Women

Rhythmic

Individual

Team

Trampoline
Australia qualified one gymnast each for the men's and women's trampoline by winning the gold at the 2021 Oceania Championships in Gold Coast.

Judo

Karate
 
Australia entered one karateka into the inaugural Olympic tournament. Tsuneari Yahiro will be competing in men's kumite 75 kg, after World Karate Federation give him continental representation quotas.

Kumite

Modern pentathlon
 
Australia qualified two modern pentathletes for the Games. London 2012 Olympian Ed Fernon and Nanjing 2014 Youth Olympian Marina Carrier, who eventually received a berth forfeited by New Zealand, secured their selection as Oceania's top-ranked modern pentathletes at the 2019 Asia & Oceania Championships in Kunming, China.

Rowing

Australia qualified nine boats for each of the following rowing classes into the Olympic regatta, with the majority of crews confirming Olympic places for their boats at the 2019 FISA World Championships in Ottensheim, Austria. Meanwhile, the women's quadruple sculls boat was awarded to the Australian roster with a top-two finish at the 2021 FISA Final Qualification Regatta in Lucerne, Switzerland.

Men

Women

Qualification Legend: FA=Final A (medal); FB=Final B (non-medal); FC=Final C (non-medal); FD=Final D (non-medal); FE=Final E (non-medal); FF=Final F (non-medal); SA/B=Semifinals A/B; SC/D=Semifinals C/D; SE/F=Semifinals E/F; QF=Quarterfinals; R=Repechage

Rugby sevens

Summary

Men's tournament

Australia national rugby sevens team qualified for the Olympics by securing an outright berth with a gold-medal victory at the 2019 Oceania Sevens Championships in Suva, Fiji.

Team roster

Group play

Women's tournament

Australia women's national rugby sevens team qualified for the Olympics by finishing among the top four and securing an outright berth at the 2018–19 World Rugby Women's Sevens Series.

Team roster
 Women's team event – 1 team of 12 players

Group play

Sailing

Australian sailors qualified one boat in each of the following classes through the 2018 Sailing World Championships, the class-associated Worlds, and the continental regattas.

On 20 September 2019, the Australian Olympic Committee announced the first set of sailors selected for Tokyo 2020, namely Rio 2016 silver medallists and defending world 470 champions Mathew Belcher and William Ryan and world's current top-ranked Laser sailor Matthew Wearn. The skiff crews (49er and 49erFX), highlighted by Ryan's sister and fellow Rio 2016 Olympian Jaime Ryan, were named to the sailing team on 27 February 2020, while Nacra 17 cousins Jason Waterhouse and Lisa Darmanin were set to defend their Rio 2016 podium finish at the Enoshima regatta, after being selected four days later. Laser Radial sailor Mara Stransky joined the sailing roster on 19 March 2020, followed by the women's 470 crew (Nia Jerwood & Monique de Vries) over a year later. Finn yachtsman and Rio 2016 Olympian Jake Lilley rounded out the sailing selection for the rescheduled Games on 21 April 2021.

Men

Women

Mixed

M = Medal race; EL = Eliminated – did not advance into the medal race

Shooting

Australian shooters achieved quota places for the following events by virtue of their best finishes at the 2018 ISSF World Championships, the 2019 ISSF World Cup series, and Oceania Championships, as long as they obtained a minimum qualifying score (MQS) by 31 May 2020.

On 17 April 2020, the Australian Olympic Committee officially announced a roster of fifteen shooters selected for the rescheduled Olympics, with pistol ace Daniel Repacholi leading them to his remarkable fifth Games, Kazakh import Dina Aspandiyarova to her fourth, and rifle marksman Dane Sampson to his third.

Men

Women

Mixed

Skateboarding

Australia qualified three skateboarder in men's and women's park events at the Games based on the Olympic World Skateboarding Rankings List of 30 June 2021.

Softball

Australia women's softball team qualified for the Olympics by winning the gold medal and securing a lone outright berth at the final match of the WBSC Women's Softball Qualifying Event for Asia and Oceania in Shanghai, China.

Summary
Legend: 
   

Team roster

Group play

Sport climbing

Australia entered two sport climbers into the Olympic tournament. Tom O'Halloran and Oceania Mackenzie qualified directly for the women's and men's combined events respectively, by advancing to the final stage and eventually winning the gold medal at the 2020 IFSC Oceania Championships in Sydney.

Surfing

Australia sent four surfers (two per gender) to compete in their respective shortboard races at the Games. Julian Wilson, Owen Wright, Sally Fitzgibbons, and Stephanie Gilmore finished within the top ten (for men) and top eight (for women), respectively, of those eligible for qualification in the World Surf League rankings to secure their places on the Australian roster for Tokyo 2020.

Qualification Legend: Q= Qualified directly for the third round; q = Qualified for the second round

Swimming 

Australian swimmers further achieved qualifying standards in the following events (up to a maximum of 2 swimmers in each event at the Olympic Qualifying Time (OQT), and potentially 1 at the Olympic Selection Time (OST)): To assure their nomination to the Olympic team, swimmers must finish in the top two of each individual pool event under both the benchmark standard and the FINA A-cut at the 2021 Australian Championships and Olympic Trials (12 to 17 June) in Adelaide.

Men

Women

Mixed

 Swimmers who participated in the heats only.

Several swimmers withdrew from events originally selected – Kyle Chalmers (200m freestyle), Emma McKeon (200m freestyle) and Matthew Temple (100m freestyle) and were replaced by swimmers already selected. On 22 July, Kaylee McKeown withdrew from the women's 200 m individual medley to focus on her backstroke double.

Table tennis

Australia entered six athletes into the table tennis competition at the Games. The men's and women's teams secured their respective Olympic berths by winning the gold medal each at the Oceania Qualification Event in Mornington, Victoria, permitting a maximum of two starters to compete each in the men's and women's singles tournament.

On 22 July 2020, Australian Olympic Committee nominated Rio 2016 Olympians David Powell and Chris Yan, returning Olympian Stephanie Sang from Beijing 2008, and rookie Michelle Bromley to compete in their respective singles tournaments for Tokyo 2020, following their top two finish at a national selection meet in Melbourne.

Men

Women

Mixed

Taekwondo

Australia entered four athletes into the taekwondo competition at the Games. Two-time Olympian Safwan Khalil (men's 58 kg), Jack Marton (men's 80 kg), Stacey Hymer (women's 57 kg), and Reba Stewart (women's +67 kg) topped the podium in each of their respective weight classes to secure the spots on the Australian squad at the 2020 Oceania Qualification Tournament in Gold Coast, Queensland.

Tennis

The main qualifying criterion will be players' positions on the ATP and WTA ranking lists published on 14 June 2021 after the 2021 French Open. The players entering were formally submitted by the International Tennis Federation. The ATP and WTA rankings were based on performances from the previous 52 weeks, and there were several tournaments in the two-month period between the time of the rankings being frozen for entry and the beginning of the tennis events at the Olympics. Players had to be part of a nominated team for three Billie Jean King Cup (women) or Davis Cup (men) events between the 2016 and 2020 Olympics. This requirement was reduced to two Fed/Davis Cup events during the Olympic cycle from 2016 to 2020 if their nation competed at the Zone Group round robin level for three of the four years or if the player had represented their nation at least twenty times.

No quota spots are available for mixed doubles; instead, all teams have to consist of players already qualified in the singles or doubles. The top 15 combined ranking teams and the host nation qualified.

Australia has four players eligible players in the men's tournaments and three in the women's.

Men

Women

Mixed

Triathlon

Australia qualified six triathletes for the following events at the Games by finishing among the top seven nations in the ITU Mixed Relay Olympic Rankings and the calculation of quotas following the 2021 World Triathlon Cup.

Individual

Relay

Volleyball

Beach
Australia women's beach volleyball pair qualified for the Games, as the result in the FIVB Beach volleyball Olympic Ranking List of 13 June 2021.

Water polo

Summary

Men's tournament

Team roster

Group play

Women's tournament

Team roster

Group play

Quarterfinal

Classification semifinal

Fifth place game

Weightlifting

Australian weightlifters qualified for five quota places at the games, based on the Tokyo 2020 Rankings Qualification List of 11 June 2021.

Non-competing sports

3 × 3 basketball
The Australian women's 3v3 basketball team participated at the 2021 FIBA 3x3 Women's Olympic Qualifying Tournament but were defeated in the quarterfinals by Spain 14–12. The men's team were not eligible for the 2021 FIBA 3x3 Olympic Qualifying Tournament based on their ranking.

Baseball
Australia was set to compete in the 2021 Final Qualifier tournament for Baseball at the 2020 Summer Olympics in Puebla, Mexico from 22 June to 26 June 2021. However, on 9 June, the team announced that due to "logistical challenges", they had made a "gut-wrenching" decision to withdraw from the tournament. Baseball Australia Chief Executive Glenn Williams said the withdrawal was due to protocols around quarantining as a result of the COVID-19 pandemic. Australia was ranked sixth in the world at the time of its announcement to withdraw.

Fencing
Australia sent six fencers to the 2021 Asian Zone Olympic Qualifying in Tashkent, Uzbekistan from 25 to 26 April. However, none of the athletes were successful in qualifying for the Olympic events. The qualifiers eventually went to  Roman Petrov from (Kyrgyzstan), Huang Mengkai (China), Sherzov Mamutov (Uzbekistan) in the men's event and Kiria Tikanah and Amita Berthier (Singapore), and Zaynab Dayibekova (Uzbekistan) in the women's event. Australia last participated in fencing at the 2004 Summer Olympics with Evelyn Halls in the women's épée.

Handball
Australia has not participated in handball at the Olympic Games since the 2000 Summer Olympics where it was the host. It has not qualified for the sport in an away tournament as of 2021.

Wrestling
Australia sent four athletes to the 2021 African & Oceania Wrestling Olympic Qualification Tournament and one athlete at the 2021 World Wrestling Olympic Qualification Tournament. However, no Australians who participated advanced to the finals to qualify for a berth at the wrestling event at the 2020 Olympics. Australia has won one silver and two bronze medals in freestyle wrestling but has not won a medal in the Greco-Roman event.

Team facts 
 The second-largest team sent from Australia to a non-home Olympic Games, behind the 482 athletes who competed at the 2004 Summer Olympics.
 The third-largest Australian contingent sent to an Olympic Games, behind the 617 athletes who competed at the 2000 Summer Olympics.
 Highest percentage of female athletes to compete for Australia – 53.5% (256 athletes) (Previous highest 50.90% Rio 2016 – 214 athletes)
 Highest number of Indigenous athletes – 16 athletes. (Previous highest 12 at Sydney 2000). Women – Ash Barty (tennis), Angeline Blackburn (athletics), Taliqua Clancy (beach volleyball), Leilani Mitchell (basketball), Brooke Peris (hockey), Stacy Porter (softball), Kyah Simon (football), Tarni Stepto (softball), Lydia Williams (football). Men – Thomas Grice (shooting sports), Maurice Longbottom (rugby sevens), Patrick Mills (basketball), Dylan Pietsch (rugby sevens), Brandon Wakeling (weightlifting), Alex Winwood (boxing)
 Oldest ever Australian Olympic competitor – Mary Hanna 66, Equestrian
 Most Olympic Games for Australia – Andrew Hoy competing at his 8th Games in Tokyo
 Most Olympic Games for Australian women – Jian Fang Lay (table tennis) and Mary Hanna (equestrian) both competing at their 6th Games in Tokyo

See also 

 Australia at the 2020 Summer Paralympics

References

Nations at the 2020 Summer Olympics
2020
2021 in Australian sport
Impact of the COVID-19 pandemic on the 2020 Summer Olympics